Heinzmann is a surname. Notable people with the surname include:

 Rolf Heinzmann, Swiss para-alpine skier
 Stefanie Heinzmann (born 1989), Swiss soul and pop singer
 Thilo Heinzmann (born 1969), German artist

See also
 Heinemann (surname)
 Hinzmann